Fragaria daltoniana is a species of strawberry native to the Himalayas. Its fruit has a poor flavor, and is of no commercial value.

All strawberries have a base haploid count of 7 chromosomes. Fragaria daltoniana is diploid, having 2 pairs of these chromosomes for a total of 14 chromosomes.. Fragaria daltoniana is one of the two Fragaria species containing a genome that is cold-resistant that can improve the growth and yielding of garden strawberry crops from abiotic stress.

References

External links
 Photo of F. daltoniana
 G.M. Darrow, The Strawberry: History, Breeding and Physiology.  Online version, chapter 8.
 

daltoniana